A list of Polish jazz groups:

Big Band Akademi Muzycznej w Katowicach
The Cracow Klezmer Band
Hagaw
Jazz Darings
June
Kury
Light Coorporation
Melomani
Mikrokolektyw
Miłość
Niechec
Skalpel
Tie Break
Voo Voo
Marcin Olak Trio

References

 
Jazz groups
Jazz groups